The Church of Saints Peter and Paul is a Roman Catholic parish church situated in the town of Athlone, County Westmeath in Ireland.

History 
The church was constructed between 1932 and 1939, and  stands on the banks of the River Shannon.

It is notable for its stained glass windows, produced in the Harry Clarke workshop by Richard King.

References 

Roman Catholic churches in County Westmeath
Roman Catholic Diocese of Meath
20th-century Roman Catholic church buildings in Ireland
Baroque Revival architecture in the Republic of Ireland
Roman Catholic churches completed in 1939
20th-century churches in the Republic of Ireland